Urkhao Gwra Brahma (born on 1st of July 1963) is an Indian politician, a poet and a leader of United People's Party Liberal who is serving as the Minister for Handloom, Textile & Sericulture, Soil Conservation and Welfare of Bodoland Department, Government of Assam in the Sarma ministry since 2021.He represents the Chapaguri constituency in the Assam Legislative Assembly since 2021. He was a former Member of the Parliament of India representing Assam in the Rajya Sabha from 2002 to 2008 as an Independent candidate. He got Sahitya Academy Award for his poetry उदांनिफ्राय गिदिंबोफिन्नानै  (Return from Freedom) in 2014. In 2015,He founded the United People's Party Liberaland became President.

References

External links
 Profile on Rajya Sabha website

Tribal people from Assam
Rajya Sabha members from Assam
Bodo people
Living people
People from Kokrajhar district
National Democratic Alliance candidates in the 2014 Indian general election
Independent politicians in India
Recipients of the Sahitya Akademi Award in Bodo
United People's Party Liberal politicians
Assam MLAs 2021–2026
1964 births